Kevin B. Kennedy is a United States Air Force lieutenant general who serves as commander of the Sixteenth Air Force. He previously served as the director for operations of the United States Cyber Command.

References

Living people
Major generals
Place of birth missing (living people)
Recipients of the Defense Superior Service Medal
Recipients of the Legion of Merit
United States Air Force generals
United States Air Force personnel of the War in Afghanistan (2001–2021)
Year of birth missing (living people)